Liberté I is a 1962 French-Senegalese film directed by Yves Ciampi. It was entered into the 1962 Cannes Film Festival.

Plot
A Senegalese midwife and her husband, who is a politician, are torn between modernity and tradition after their homeland becomes independent.

Cast
 Hassane Fall as Abdoulaye
 Corinne Marchand as Anne
 Maurice Ronet as Michel
 Nanette Senghor as Aminata

References

External links

1962 films
French drama films
Senegalese drama films
1960s French-language films
French black-and-white films
Senegalese black-and-white films
Films directed by Yves Ciampi
1960s French films